Roniel da Silva Costa (born 2 June 1994), known as just Roniel, is a Brazilian footballer that plays as a forward for Anápolis Futebol Clube on loan from Grêmio Anápolis.

Club career
Roniel started his career with Morrinhos in 2013. Later in the year he signed for Rioverdense. In 2014, he joined Grêmio Anápolis. He made 14 appearances for the club scoring 2 goals. On 30 June 2014, he was transferred to Porto B.

On 8 July 2015, Roniel was loaned to Paços de Ferreira. He made his debut in the Primeira Liga on 17 August 2015 in a game against Académica de Coimbra and scored on his debut.

References

External links
 
 

1994 births
Brazilian footballers
Brazilian expatriate footballers
Living people
Association football forwards
Primeira Liga players
Liga Portugal 2 players
Grêmio Esportivo Brasil players
FC Porto B players
F.C. Paços de Ferreira players
C.D. Nacional players
C.F. União players
Leixões S.C. players
Anápolis Futebol Clube players
Brazilian expatriate sportspeople in Portugal
Expatriate footballers in Portugal